Teja Singh Samundri (1882-1926) was one of the founder members of Shiromani Gurdwara Prabandhak Committee and played an important role in the gurudwara reform movement.

Samundri was born to Deva Singh and Nand Kaur on 20 February 1882 at Rai Ka Burj in tahsil Tarn Taran, Amritsar district, Punjab. His village was Chak 140 GB

References

Further reading

source of information; http://www.sikh-history.com/sikhhist/personalities/sewadars/teja_singh_samundri.html

Indian Sikhs
Sikh politics
People from Samundri
People from Tarn Taran Sahib
1882 births
1926 deaths